Cydia falsifalcellum is a moth of the family Tortricidae. It was first described by Lord Walsingham in 1907. It is endemic to the island of Hawaii. It is rare due to a lack of host plants.

The larvae feed on Canavalia species and possibly Vicia menziessii and Strogylodon ruber. They feed on the seeds and stems and possibly the flowers of their host plant.

External links

Species info

Grapholitini
Endemic moths of Hawaii